Matti Järvinen (born 14 October 1989) is a Finnish professional ice hockey center. His is currently playing with HPK in the Liiga

Järvinen made his SM-liiga debut playing with Espoo Blues during the 2011–12 SM-liiga season.

Awards and honours

References

External links

1989 births
Living people
Alabama–Huntsville Chargers men's ice hockey players
Espoo Blues players
Finnish ice hockey centres
Grizzlys Wolfsburg players
Jokipojat players
KalPa players
Kiekko-Vantaa players
SaiPa players
Tappara players
EV Zug players